Brooke Stevens is an American novelist. His first novel, The Circus of the Earth and the Air, was a nominee for the Barnes & Noble Discover Great New Writers Award in 1994 and a finalist for the World Fantasy Award in 1995. He has published two subsequent novels, not works of fantasy, and has taught creative writing at Sarah Lawrence College. His work has been translated into French, German and Japanese and it has also been published in the UK. He lives in Kent, Connecticut.

Bibliography
The Circus of the Earth and the Air, New York: Harcourt Brace, 1994, 
Die Insel der Wahrheit, Aufbau-Verlag, 1996 (German edition)
Circus, Éditions Autrement, 2008. (French edition)
Tattoo Girl, New York: St. Martin's Press, 2001, 
Tattoo Girl, Éditions Autrement, 2003 (French edition)
Der Wassermann, Bastei Lübbe, 2003 (German edition)
Tattoo Girl, Piatkus Books, 2002 (British edition)
Tattoo Girl, Kondansha, 2003 (Japanese edition)
Kissing Your Ex, New York: Penguin USA, 2004,

References

External links
Stevens website

20th-century American novelists
21st-century American novelists
American fantasy writers
American male novelists
American thriller writers
Living people
Year of birth missing (living people)
Sarah Lawrence College faculty
People from Kent, Connecticut
Novelists from Connecticut
20th-century American male writers
21st-century American male writers
Novelists from New York (state)